Discoceps fasciatus is a species of beetle in the family Cerambycidae, and the only species in the genus Discoceps. It was described by Karl Jordan in 1894.

References

Acmocerini
Beetles described in 1894
Monotypic Cerambycidae genera